Thomas Sykes (born in Georgia, United States) was an American politician.  He was elected to the Mississippi House of Representatives from Panola County in 1873. He was African American and had a wife and children.

See also
African-American officeholders during and following the Reconstruction era

References

Members of the Mississippi House of Representatives
African-American politicians during the Reconstruction Era
19th-century American politicians
Year of birth missing
Year of death missing